Ur also called Ur/Web is a free and open-source functional programming language specific for web development, created by Adam Chlipala at the Massachusetts Institute of Technology that from a single program produces server code, browser client code and SQL code specific for the chosen database backend.

Ur supports a powerful kind of metaprogramming based on row types.

Ur/Web is Ur plus a special standard library and associated rules for parsing and optimization. Ur/Web supports construction of dynamic web applications backed by SQL databases. The signature of the standard library is such that well-typed Ur/Web programs "don't go wrong" in a very broad sense. Not only do they not crash during particular page generations, but they also may not:

 Suffer from any kinds of code injection attacks
 Return invalid HTML
 Contain dead intra-application links
 Have mismatches between HTML forms and the fields expected by their handlers
 Include client-side code that makes incorrect assumptions about the "AJAX"-style services that the remote web server provides
 Attempt invalid SQL queries
 Use improper marshaling or unmarshaling in communication with SQL databases or between browsers and web servers

This type safety is just the foundation of the Ur/Web methodology. It is also possible to use metaprogramming to build significant application pieces by analysis of type structure.

The Ur/Web compiler also produces very efficient object code that does not use garbage collection.

The implementation of all this is open source.

SQL syntax templates embedded in the language facilitate the handling of tables.

Although the syntax is based on Standard ML the language includes concepts from Haskell with additional type manipulation.

Ajax call/response is serialized through a monad called transaction (corresponds to Haskell's IO) and its marshalling and decoding is encapsulated in the rpc function.

The browser client side includes functional reactive programming facilities using the (source a) type and a signal monad.

Example program 

This is a demo program showing client, server and database code with Ajax communication, from the web demos, with extra comments to outline each of the components:

Interface file (ML-like signature) with  extension:
(* the environment monad is called transaction, corresponds to Haskell's IO monad *)
val main : unit -> transaction page

Implementation file (.ur extension):
datatype list t = Nil | Cons of t * list t

table t : { Id : int, A : string }
  PRIMARY KEY Id

(* server side database access, called through AJAX XmlHttpRequest
                    encapsulated as ''rpc'' function (remote procedure call) *)
fun add id s =
    (* sql dml template with {[expression]} *)
    dml (INSERT INTO t (Id, A) VALUES ({[id]}, {[s]}))

fun del id =
    dml (DELETE FROM t WHERE t.Id = {[id]})

fun lookup id =
    (* haskell style monadic code *)
    ro <- oneOrNoRows (SELECT t.A FROM t WHERE t.Id = {[id]});
    case ro of
        None => return None           (* return is the ''monad'' lifting function *)
      | Some r => return (Some r.T.A)

(* ''check'' called by client side onClick event handler,
               so it will be compiled to JavaScript as page embedded client script *)
fun check ls =
    case ls of
        Nil => return
      | Cons (id, ls') =>
            ao <- rpc (lookup id);      (* Ajax call to server side *)
            alert (case ao of
                   None => "Nada"
                 | Some a => a
                 );
            check ls'

fun main =
    idAdd <- source "";
    aAdd <- source "";

    idDel <- source "";

    (* generates web page with JavaScript inclusions *)
    return <xml><body>
      <button value="Check values of 1, 2, and 3"
              onclick={fn _ => let val mylist = 1 :: 2 :: 3 :: []
                               in
                                  check mylist
                               end
                               }/><br/>
      <br/>
      <button value="Add"
              onclick={fn _ => id <- get idAdd;
                               a <- get aAdd;
                               rpc (add (readError id) a)  (* Ajax call to server side *)
                               }/>
      <ctextbox source={idAdd}/>
      <ctextbox source={aAdd}/><br/>
      <br/>
      <button value="Delete"
              onclick={fn _ => id <- get idDel;
                               rpc (del (readError id))    (* Ajax call to server side *)
                               }/>
      <ctextbox source={idDel}/>
    </body></xml>

Project file (.urp extension), must contain an optional directive list followed by a listing of project modules:

 # hash prefixed line comments
 rewrite url Module1/main        # set root URL to Module1/main function
 exe myexename
 database dbname=test            # database attrib. and parameters
 sql noisy.sql

 $/list     # stdlib modules prefixed with "$/"
 module2    # if used by module1 it must precede it
 module1    # main module

 To export a page which may cause side effects, accessible only via HTTP POST, include one argument of the page handler of type Basis.postBody.

Compile:

 urweb module1   # looks for module1.urpExecute as a web server (other modes are CGI, FastCGI, ...):
 ./module1.exe -p 8081   # -h : RTS options help Libraries 
 The predefined API
 The standard library
 Per feature tests
 Ur wiki - Libraries and FFI bindings

 Special features and problems 

 Record updating

datatype mystruc k v = Empty | Node of {Key: k, Value: v}

fun setKey [k][v] (* type polymorphism *)
           (_: ord k) (* implicit instance of class ord *)
           (callerErrNote: string) (k1: k) (my: mystruc k v) : mystruc k v =
   if k1 < kmin
   then error <xml>setKey: illegal k1 {[callerErrNote]}</xml>
   else case my of
             Node r => Node (r -- #Key ++ {Key = k1})
             | _ => error <xml>setKey: not a Node {[callerErrNote]}</xml>
corresponding signature (kind annotations implicit; explicit):
con mystruc :: Type -> Type -> Type    (* two param. type constructor *)

val setKey : k ::: Type -> v ::: Type -> ord k -> string -> k -> mystruc k v -> mystruc k v

 Record fields ellipsis
  case my of
    Node {Key = k, ...} => doWhatever k
    | _ => ....

 Error "Substitution in constructor is blocked by a too-deep unification variable"

This error happens with types of arity > 0 in nested case or let'' clauses and disappears by type annotating the variables in the nested clauses.

See also 
 Dark, a programming language for integrated backend development
 Opa, a programming language for combined frontend-backend development

References

External links 
 Ur language home page
 Ur/Web project page on GitHub
 Ur wiki

Functional languages
Massachusetts Institute of Technology software
ML programming language family